Cape Verdean Creole is a Portuguese-based creole language spoken on the islands of Cape Verde. It is the native creole language of virtually all Cape Verdeans and is used as a second language by the Cape Verdean diaspora.

The creole has particular importance for creolistics studies since it is the oldest living creole. It is the most widely spoken Portuguese-based creole language.

Name 
The formal designation of this creole is Cape Verdean Creole, but in everyday usage the creole is simply called  ('Creole') by its speakers.

Origins 

The history of Cape Verdean Creole is hard to trace due to a lack of written documentation and to ostracism during the Portuguese administration of Cape Verde.

There are presently three theories about the formation of Creole. The monogenetic theory claims that the creole was formed by the Portuguese by simplifying the Portuguese language in order to make it accessible to African slaves. That is the point of view of authors like Prudent, Waldman, Chaudenson and Lopes da Silva. Authors like Adam and Quint argue that Creole was formed by African slaves using the grammar of Western African languages and replacing the African lexicon with the Portuguese one. Linguists like Chomsky and Bickerton argue that Creole was formed spontaneously, not by slaves from continental Africa, but by the population born in the islands, using the grammar with which all human beings are born; this would explain how creoles located many miles apart have similar grammatical structures, even though they have a different lexical basis.

According to A. Carreira, Cape Verdean Creole was formed from a Portuguese pidgin, on the island of Santiago, starting from the 15th century. That pidgin was then transported to the west coast of Africa by the lançados. From there, that pidgin diverged into two proto-Creoles, one that was the base of all Cape Verdean Creoles, and another that was the base of the Guinea-Bissau Creole.

Cross referencing information regarding the settlement of each island with the linguistic comparisons, it is possible to form some conjectures. The spreading of Cape Verdean Creole within the islands was done in three phases:
 In a first phase, the island of Santiago was occupied (2nd half of the 15th century), followed by Fogo (end of the 16th century).
 In a second phase, the island of São Nicolau was occupied (mostly in the 2nd half of the 17th century), followed by Santo Antão (mostly in the 2nd half of the 17th century).
 In a third phase, the remaining islands were occupied by settlers from the first islands: Brava was occupied by people from Fogo (mostly in the beginning of the 18th century), Boa Vista by people from São Nicolau and Santiago (mostly in the 1st half of the 18th century), Maio by people from Santiago and Boa Vista (mostly in the 2nd half of the 18th century), São Vicente by people from Santo Antão and São Nicolau (mostly in the 19th century), Sal by people from São Nicolau and Boa Vista (mostly in the 19th century).

Status 
In spite of Creole being the first language of nearly all the population in Cape Verde, Portuguese is still the official language. As Portuguese is used in everyday life (at school, in administration, in official acts, in relations with foreign countries, etc.), Portuguese and Cape Verdean Creole live in a state of diglossia. Due to this overall presence of Portuguese, a decreolization process occurs for all the different Cape Verdean Creole variants.

Check in this fictional text:
 Santiago variant:
 
 São Vicente variant:
 .
 Translation to Portuguese:
 
 Translation to English:
 That woman with whom I met yesterday was worried because she forgot her children at school, and when she went to seek them she didn't see them. Someone reminded her that her children were needing some material for a research, and so she found them at the library searching what they needed. To thank to everyone who helped her, she started speaking, telling how she was glad from the bottom of her heart.

In this text, several situations of decreolization / Portuguese intromission can be noted:
cú quêm / c' quêmPortuguese order of words com quem;
encôntra / encontráPortuguese lexicon, in Creole it would be more commonly átcha / otchá;
priocupádaPortuguese lexicon, in Creole it would be more commonly fadigáda;
púrqui / púrqPortuguese lexicon, in Creole it would be more commonly pamódi / pamód;
sês minínus / sês m'nín'sPortuguese influence (plural marker on both words);
procurâ-'s / procurá-'sPortuguese lexicon, in Creole it would be more commonly spiâ-'s / spiá-'s;
olhâ-'s / olhá-'sPortuguese phonetics (intromission of the phoneme );
quí / qu’Portuguese lexicon, the integrant conjunction in Creole is ’mâ;
sâ tâ pricisába / táva ta pr'cisáPortuguese lexicon, in Creole it would be more commonly sâ tâ mestêba / táva tâ mestê;
material, pesquisa, bibliotecawords pretty uncommon in a basilect; if they are Portuguese words used when speaking Creole they should be pronounced in Portuguese and written in italic or between quotation marks;
úqui / úqintromission of Portuguese o que;
gradêci â / gradecê âwrong preposition, the Portuguese preposition "a" does not exist in Creole;
fálathis form (from contemporary Portuguese falar) is only used in São Vicente and Santo Antão, in the other islands the word is papiâ (from old Portuguese papear);
cômu / cômintromission of Portuguese como;

The same text "corrected":
 Santiago variant:
 
 São Vicente variant:
 

As a consequence there is a continuum between basilectal and acrolectal varieties.

In spite of Creole not being officialized, a 2005 government resolution put forth the necessary conditions for the officialization of Creole, which in turn has been superseded by a 2015 resolution. This officialization has not yet occurred, mostly because the language is not yet standardized, for several reasons:
 There is significant dialectal fragmentation. Speakers are reluctant to speak a variant that is not their own.
 Absence of rules to establish which is the right form (and also the right spelling) to be adopted for each word. For example, for the word corresponding to the Portuguese word algibeira ("pocket"), A. Fernandes records the forms algibêra, agibêra, albigêra, aljubêra, alj'bêra, gilbêra, julbêra, lijbêra.
 Absence of rules to establish which are the lexical limits to be adopted. It is frequent for speakers of Creole, when writing, to join different grammatical classes. For ex.: pâm... instead of pâ m'... "for me to...".
 Absence of rules to establish which are the grammatical structures to be adopted. It is not just about dialectal differences; even within a single variant there are fluctuations. For ex.: in the Santiago variant, when there are two sentences and one is subordinated to the other, there is a tense agreement in the verbs (bú cría pâ m' dába "you wanted me to give"both cría and dába are past tense), but some speakers do not practice it (bú cría pâ m' dâpast then presentor bú crê pâ m' dábapresent then past).
 The writing system (ALUPEC) has not been well accepted by all Creole users.
 The language levels (formal, informal, scientific, slang, etc.) are not well differentiated yet.

That is the reason why each speaker when speaking (or writing) uses their own dialect, their own sociolect, and their own idiolect.

To overcome these problems, some Creole advocates propose the development of two standards: a North (Barlavento) standard, centered on the São Vicente variant, and a South (Sotavento) standard, centered on that of Santiago. If so, Creole would become a pluricentric language

There exists no complete translation of the Bible. However, the "Asosiason Kabuverdianu pa Traduson di Bíblia" was established with the goal of translating the entire Bible in Kabuverdianu-Sotaventu and Kabuverdianu-Barlaventu. They have translated approximately 40% of the New Testament in the Kabuverdianu-Sotaventu, and they have published Luke and Acts. The publication of Luke has won two awards in Cape Verde.  Sérgio Frusoni translated Bartolomeo Rossetti's version of the Romanesco Italian poem Er Vangelo Seconno Noantri, which is a poem based on the Four Gospels. Frusoni translated the poem in the São Vicente Creole, Vangêle contód d'nôs móda.

 Writing system 

The only writing system officially recognized by the authorities in Cape Verde is called the Alfabeto Unificado para a Escrita da Língua Cabo-verdiana (ALUPEC), which was approved for official use on an experimental basis in 1998 by Decree-Law No. 67/98. In 2009, Decree-Law No. 8/2009 officially institutionalized the use of the ALUPEC. 
In spite of having been officially recognized by the government, the ALUPEC is neither required nor mandatorily used.

In spite of being the only system officially recognized, the same law allows the use of alternative writing models, "as long as they are presented in a systematic and scientific way". As not all users are familiarized with ALUPEC or the IPA, in this article a slightly different system will be used to make it easier for the reader:
The sound  will be represented in an etymological way ("s" when in Portuguese is "s", "ss" when in Portuguese is "ss", "c" when in Portuguese is "c", "ç" when in Portuguese is "ç") instead of ALUPEC always "s".
The sound  will be represented in an etymological way ("s" when in Portuguese is "s", "z" when in Portuguese is "z") instead of ALUPEC always "z".
The sound  will be represented by "tch" instead of ALUPEC "tx".
The sound  will be represented in an etymological way ("x" when in Portuguese is "x", "ch" when in Portuguese is "ch") instead of ALUPEC always "x".
The sound  will be represented in an etymological way ("j" when in Portuguese is "j", "g" when in Portuguese is "g") instead of ALUPEC always "j".
The sound  will be represented in an etymological way ("c" when in Portuguese is "c", "qu" when in Portuguese is "qu") instead of ALUPEC always "k".
The sound  will be represented in an etymological way ("g" when in Portuguese is "g", "gu" when in Portuguese is "gu") instead of ALUPEC always "g".
The nasality of the vowels will be represented by an "m" after the vowel, when this vowel is at the end of the word or before the letters "p" and "b". In the other cases the nasality will be represented by the letter "n".
The words will always have a graphic accent. This will be an overwhelming use of accents, but it is the only way to effectively represent both the stressed syllable and vowel aperture.
To show an elided vowel in certain variants an apostrophe ''' will be used.

 Vocabulary 

The vocabulary of Cape Verdean Creole comes mainly from Portuguese. Although several sources do not agree, the figures oscillate between 90 and 95% of words from Portuguese. The remaining comes from several languages from Western Africa (Mandingo, Wolof, Fulani, Temne, Balanta, Mandjak, etc.), and the vocabulary from other languages (English, French, Latin) is negligible.

 Phonology 

Cape Verdean Creole's phonological system comes mainly from 15th-through-17th-century Portuguese.

Vowels
There are eight oral vowels and their corresponding nasal counterparts, making a total of sixteen vowels:

Consonants and semi-vowels

First-person singular
The personal pronoun that represents the subject form of the first person singular has a variable pronunciation according to the islands.

This pronoun comes from the object form of the first person singular in Portuguese mim, and it is phonetically reduced to the sound .

This pronunciation is nowadays found in the Barlavento variants. In the Sotavento variants that consonant  was reduced to a simple nasality . For example: m' andâ  ('I have walked'), m' stâ tâ sintí  ('I am feeling'), m' labába  ('I had washed'). Before plosive or affricate consonants this nasality becomes homorganic nasal of the following consonant. For ex.: m' bêm  ('I came'), m' têm  ('I have'), m' tchigâ  ('I arrived'), m' crê  ('I want').

Speakers who are strongly influenced by the Portuguese language tend to pronounce this pronoun as a nasal vowel úm  instead of m .

Before some forms of the verb sêr this pronoun takes back its full form mí , in whatever variant: mí ê  ('I am'), mí éra  ('I was').

In this article, this pronoun is conventionally written m, no matter the variant.

 Grammar 

Even though over 90% of Cape Verdean Creole words are derived from Portuguese, the grammar is very different, which makes it extremely difficult for an untrained Portuguese native speaker even to understand a basic conversation. On the other hand, the grammar shows a lot of similarities with other creoles, Portuguese-based or not (see syntactic similarities of creoles).

Sentence structure
The basic sentence structure in Creole is SubjectVerbObject. Ex.:Êl tâ cumê pêxi. "He eats fish."

When there are two objects, the indirect object comes first while the direct object comes after, and the sentence structure becomes SubjectVerbIndirect ObjectDirect Object. Ex.:Êl tâ dâ pêxi cumída. "He gives food to the fish."

A feature that makes Cape Verdean Creole closer to other creoles is the possibility of double negation (ex.: Náda m' câ atchâ. liter. "Nothing I didn't find."), or sometimes even triple negation (ex.: Núnca ninguêm câ tâ bába lâ. liter. "Never nobody didn't go there."). Although double negation is common in Portuguese (e.g. "Nunca ninguém foi lá"), triple negation is a little bit uncommon.

Nouns

Gender inflection
Only the animated nouns (human beings and animals) have gender inflection. Ex.:inglês / inglésa "Englishman / Englishwoman"pôrcu / pórca "pig (male) / pig (female)"

In some cases the distinction between sexes is made putting the adjectives mátchu "male" and fémia "female" after the nouns. Ex.:fídju-mátchu / fídju-fémia "son / daughter"catchôrr'-mátchu / catchôrr'-fémia "dog (male) / dog (female)"

Number inflection
The nouns in Creole have number inflection (plural marks) only when they are well determined or known in the context. Ex.:
 Minínus dí Bía ê bêm comportádu. ("The children of Bia are well behaved.")

When the noun refers to something in general that noun does not have number inflection. Ex.:
 Minínu devê ruspetâ alguêm grándi. ("Children must respect grown up people.")

If in a sentence there are several grammatical categories, only the first bears the plural marker. Ex.:
 minínus ("boys")
 nhâs minína ("my girls")
 minínus bunítu ("beautiful boys")
 nhâs dôs minína buníta í simpática ("my two kind and beautiful girls")Further reading: 

Personal pronouns
According to their function, the pronouns can be subject pronouns or object pronouns. Furthermore, in each of these functions, according to the position within the sentence the pronouns can be unstressed or stressed.

The unstressed subject pronouns generally bear the function of the subject and come before the verb. Ex.:Nú crê. "We want."

The stressed subject pronouns bear the function of some kind of vocative and usually are separated from the verb (disjunctive pronouns). Ex.:Mí, m' stâ lí, í bô, bú stâ lâ. "Me, I am here, and you, you are there."

The object pronouns, as the name shows, bear the function of the object (direct or indirect). The unstressed object pronouns are used with the present-tense forms of verbs. Ex.:M' odjá-'l. "I have seen it."M' tâ bejá-bu. "I kiss you."

The stressed object pronouns are used with the past-tense forms of verbs, when they are the second pronoun in a series of two pronouns, and after prepositions (prepositional pronouns). Ex.:Ês tâ odjába-êl. "They saw it."Bú dâ-m'-êl. "You gave it to me."M' stâ fártu dí bô! "I'm fed up of you!"

When there are two object pronouns, the indirect pronoun comes first while the direct pronoun comes after, and the sentence structure becomes SubjectVerbIndirect PronounDirect Pronoun.

There are no reflexive pronouns. To indicate reflexivity, Creole uses the expression cabéça ("head") after the possessive determiner. Ex.:Ês mordê sês cabéça. "They have bitten themselves."

There are no reciprocal pronouns. To indicate reciprocity, Creole uses the expression cumpanhêru ("companion"). Ex.:Ês mordê cumpanhêru. "They have bitten each other."

Verbs
The verbs have only minimal inflection (two forms). They have the same form for all the persons, and the notions of tense, mood and aspect are expressed through the presence (or absence) of certain morphemes (called "verbal actualizers" by Veiga), as in the majority of creoles.

The verbs are generally reduced to two base forms, one for the present, another for the past. The form for the present is the same as the form for the infinitive (exception: sêr "to be"), that in turn comes, in the majority of the verbs, from the infinitive in Portuguese but without the final r. Ex.: cantâ  (from Portuguese cantar), mexê  (from Portuguese mexer), partí  (from Portuguese partir), compô  (from Portuguese compor), *lumbú  (from Portuguese lombo). The form for the past is formed from the infinitive to which is joined the particle for the past ~ba. Ex.: cantába , mexêba , partíba , compôba , *lumbúba  (in the Barlavento variants, the particle for the past ~va (or ~ba) is joined to the imperfective actualizer, and not to the verb). It is noteworthy that the Upper Guinea creoles (Cape Verdean Creole and Guinea-Bissau Creole) put the past tense marker after the verbs, and not before like the majority of creoles (check syntactic similarities of creoles).

It is important to mention that in the Santiago variant, the stress goes back to before the last syllable in the present tense forms of the verbs. Therefore, we have: cánta  instead of cantâ , mêxe  or mêxi  instead of mexê , pârti  instead of partí , cômpo  or cômpu  instead of compô , búmbu  instead of bumbú . In the pronominal forms, however, the stress remains on the last syllable: cantâ-m , mexê-bu , partí-'l , compô-nu , bumbú-'s .

Regular verbs
As said before, the regular verbs are reduced to a form for the present tense and a form for the past tense, and the notions of mood and aspect are expressed through verbal actualizers.

The following table shows a paradigm of the indicative mood with the verb dâ "to give" in the first-person singular:

The perfective aspect of the present is used when the speech refers to present situations, but that are finished, that are complete. Ex.:M' dâ.  "I gave. / I have given."
It corresponds roughly, according to context, to the past tense or present perfect in English.

The imperfective aspect of the present is used when the speech refers to present situations, but that are not finished yet, that are incomplete. Ex.:M' tâ dâ.  "I give."
It corresponds roughly to the present tense in English.

The progressive aspect of the present is used when the speech refers to present situations that are happening in a continuous, uninterrupted way. Ex.:M' stâ tâ dâ.  "I am giving."
It corresponds roughly to the present continuous tense in English.
Note: Actually, this model doesn't exist anymore. It has evolved to M' stâ dâ.  in Brava Fogo and Maio, to M' sâ tâ dâ.  in Santiago, to M' tâ tâ dâ.  in Boa Vista, Sal and São Nicolau and to M' ti tâ dá.  in São Vicente and Santo Antão.

There is no specific form for the future. The future of the present may be expressed through three resources:
Using the imperfective of the present but bearing the function of the future. Ex.: M' tâ dâ manhã.  liter. "I give tomorrow."
Using the auxiliary verb "to go". Ex.: M' tâ bái dâ.  liter. "I go to give."
Using a periphrasis showing an eventuality. Ex.: M' ál dâ.   "I will give."
It corresponds roughly to the future tense in English.

The perfective aspect of the past is used when the speech refers to past situations that were finished, or complete. Ex.:M' dába.  "I had given."
It corresponds roughly to the past perfect in English.
Note: This form does not exist in the Barlavento variants.

The imperfective aspect of the past is used when the speech refers to past situations that were not finished yet, or incomplete. Ex.:M' tâ dába.  "I gave. / I used to give."
It corresponds roughly to the past tense in English.
Note: In the Barlavento variants the particle for the past is joined to the imperfective actualizer and not to the verb: M' táva dâ. . In São Nicolau, along with M' táva dâ also subsists the older form M' tá dába .

The progressive aspect of the past is used when the speech refers to past situations that were happening in a continuous and uninterrupted way. Ex.:M' stába tâ dâ.  "I was giving."
It corresponds roughly to the past continuous tense in English.
Note: Actually, this model only exists in Brava and Fogo. It has evolved to M' sâ tâ dába.  in Santiago and Maio and to M' táva tâ dâ.  in Boa Vista, Sal, São Nicolau, São Vicente and Santo Antão.

There is no specific form for the future. The future of the past may be expressed through three resources:
Using the imperfective of the past but bearing the function of the future. Ex.: M' tâ dába manhã.  liter. "I gave tomorrow."
Using the auxiliary verb "to go". Ex.: M' tâ bába dâ.  liter. "I went to give."
Using a periphrasis showing an eventuality. Ex.: M' ál dába.  [m al  "I would give."
It corresponds roughly to the conditional in English.

The remaining moodssubjunctive, conditional (not the same as "conditional" in English), eventualdo not have different aspects, only present and past tense, except the injunctive (imperative) mood which has only the present tense.

Irregular verbs
There is a group of verbs that do not follow the paradigmatic model presented above. They are the auxiliary verbs sêr  "to be", stâ  "to be", têm  "to have" and tenê  "to have", and the modal verbs crê  "to want", sabê  "to know", podê  "can", devê  "must" and mestê  "to need".
 Note.: The designation "auxiliary verbs" is not consensual.

There exist two registers for these verbs.

In the first register (in older speakers, in rural areas speakers or in speakers with little exposure to Portuguese) there are only two forms for the verbs: one for the present (ê , stâ , têm , tenê , crê , sabê , podê , devê , mestê ) and one for the past (éra , stába , têmba /tẽ, tenêba , crêba , sabêba , podêba , devêba , mestêba ). However, on the contrary of regular verbs, when the base form is used alone it represents the imperfective aspect and not the perfective aspect. Therefore, mí ê, m' têm, m' crê, m' sabê mean "I am, I have, I want, I know", and not "I've been, I've had, I've wanted, I've known", as it would be expected. Parallelly, mí éra, m' têmba, m' crêba, m' sabêba mean "I was, I had, I wanted, I knew", and not "I had been, I had had, I had wanted, I had known", as would be expected.

In the second register (among younger speakers, in urban areas or in speakers with more exposure to Portuguese) the system has been enriched with other forms influenced by Portuguese. Therefore, we have:ê , stâ , têm , crê , sabê , podê , devê , mestê  for the imperfective of the present;fôi , stêvi evi/, têvi vi/, crís , sôbi bi/, púdi di/ for the perfective of the present;éra , stába , tínha , cría , sabía , pudía , divía , mistía  for the imperfective of the past;sêrba , stába , têmba ẽ, crêba , sabêba , podêba , devêba , mestêba  for the perfective of the past;
Note.: Some authors call these verbs "stative verbs" and to these verbs they add others: gostâ, conxê, merecê, morâ, tchomâ, valê. However that designation is contested: not all those verbs are in fact stative; not all those verbs are irregular (for ex. morâ); some of those verbs are regular in some variants (m' tâ gostâimperfective of the present with tâ), and irregulars in other variants (m' gostâimperfective of the present but without tâ).

There is a parallelism between the pair of the verbs sêr / stâ "to be" and the pair of the verbs têm / tenê "to have".
The verb sêr is a copulative verb that expresses a permanent quality. Ex.:Mí ê úm ómi.  "I am (I've always been and I will always be) a man."
The verb stâ is a copulative verb that expresses a temporary state. Ex.:Êl stâ trísti.  "He is (in this precise moment) sad."
The verb têm is a possessive verb that expresses a permanent quality. Ex.:M' têm péli scúru.  "I have (I had and I will always have) dark skin."
The verb tenê is a possessive verb that expresses a temporary possession. Ex.:M' tenê úm canéta nâ bôlsu.  "I have (in this precise moment) a pen in the pocket."

<small>Note.: The verbs stâ and tenê do not have the progressive aspect: forms like *m' stâ tâ stâ or *m' stâ tâ tenê do not exist. The verb tenê does not exist in the Barlavento variants. In São Vicente and Santo Antão the verb stâ has the form stód for the infinitive, tâ for the imperfective of the present, tív for the perfective of the present, and táva for the imperfective of the past.</small>

Passive
Cape Verdean Creole has two voices. The active voice is used when the subject is explicit. The passive voice is used when the subject is indeterminate or unknown. There is also two forms for the passive. The form for the present is made with the infinitive to which is joined the particle ~du. The form for the past is made with the infinitive to which is joined the particle ~da. Ex.:
 Tâ papiádu inglês nâ Mérca.    "English is spoken in America."
 M' inxinádu tâ andâ.  "I was taught to walk."
 Úm vêz, tâ cumêda tchêu mídju.  "Once, one used to eat a lot of corn."
Note.: In the Barlavento variants the form for the past does not exist.

Negative
To negate a verb, the negative adverb câ  is used after the subject and before any verbal actualizer. Ex.:Nú câ tâ bebê.  "We don't drink."Êl câ tâ odjába.  "He didn't see."Bú câ bái.  "You haven't gone."

In the Santo Antão variant, the negative adverb is n . Ex.:Nô n' dâ bibê.  "We don't drink."Êl n' dáva o'á.  "He didn't see."Bô n' bé.  "You haven't gone."

In imperative sentences the negative adverb câ  is always in the beginning. Ex.:Câ bú bái!  "Don't go!" (yousingular)Câ nhôs fazê!  (Sotavento), Câ b'sôt' fazê!  (Barlavento) "Don't do!" (you-plural)

And in the Santo Antão variant:N' bô bé! /n bo  "Don't go!" (yousingular)N' b'sôt' fezê!  "Don't do!" (youplural)

Adjectives
Adjectives in Creole almost always come after the noun. Only the animated nouns (human beings and animals) demand gender inflection in their adjectives. Ex.:ómi fêiu / mudjêr fêia "ugly man / ugly woman"bódi prêtu / cábra préta "black buck / black goat"

The adjectives for unanimated nouns have the same form as the masculine adjectives. Ex.:bistídu bráncu "white dress"camísa bráncu "white shirt"

In general the plural marker does not appear on adjectives since it comes in a preceding grammatical category.

Determiners
In Creole there are no definite articles. If it is absolutely necessary to determine the noun, the demonstrative determiners are used instead.

For the indefinite articles there are two forms, one for the singular, another for the plural:úm...  "a, an (singular)", úns...  "a, an (plural)"

The possessive determiners have number inflexion, but the plural refers to the objects possessed, and not to the owners. Ex.:nhâ cárru "my car"nhâs cárru "my cars"nôs cárru can be either "our car" or "our cars"

The demonstrative determiners have only two degrees of proximity: close to the speaker (êss "this, these") and away from the speaker (quêl "that", quês "those").
Note.: Only the São Vicente and Santo Antão Creoles make a phonetic distinction between the singular êss  ("this") and the plural ês  ("these").

Designatives
Creole possesses a special grammatical category for presenting or announcing something. It appears in two forms, one to present something near, (alí... ) and another to present something far (alâ... ). Ex.:Alí nhâ fídju. "Here is my son."Alá-'l tâ bái. "There he goes."

Dialects

In spite of Cape Verde's small size, each island has developed its own way of speaking Creole. Each of these nine ways (there are 10 islands, one of which is uninhabited) is justifiably a different dialect, but the scholars in Cape Verde usually call them "variants". These variants can be classified into two branches: in the South there are the Sotavento Creoles, which comprise the Brava, Fogo, Santiago and Maio variants; in the North there are the Barlavento Creoles, which comprise the Boa Vista, Sal, São Nicolau, São Vicente and Santo Antão variants.

Since some lexical forms of Cape Verdean Creole can be different according to each variant, the words and the sentences in this article will be presented in compromise model, a kind of "middle Creole", in order to ease the understanding and in order not to favor any variant. Whenever it will be necessary the phonemic transcription (or sometimes the phonetic transcription) will be shown immediately after the word.

For the writing system, check the section Writing system.

From a linguistic point of view, the most important variants are the Fogo, Santiago, São Nicolau and Santo Antão ones, and any deep study of Creole should approach at least these four. They are the only islands that have received slaves directly from the African continent, that possess the most conservative linguistic features, and that are the most distinct from each other.

From a social point of view, the most important variants are the Santiago and São Vicente ones, and any light study of Creole should approach at least these two. They are the variants of the two bigger cities (Praia and Mindelo), the variants with the greatest number of speakers, and the variants with a glottophagist tendency over the neighboring ones.

These variants have significant literature:
 Brava: Eugénio Tavares
 Fogo: Elsie Clews Parsons
 Santiago: Carlos Barbosa, Tomé Varela da Silva, Daniel Spínola
 São Vicente: Sérgio Frusoni, Ovídio Martins
 Santo Antão: Luís Romano Madeira de Melo

Dialectal differences

Sotavento
The Sotavento Creoles are spoken in the Sotavento Islands. Some characteristics:
The imperfective aspect of the past is formed joining the particle for the past ~ba to the verb: tâ + V+ba.
The personal pronoun for the second person of the plural is nhôs.
The subject form of the personal pronoun for the first person of the singular is represented by a nasalization. Ex.: m' andâ pronounced  instead of  "I have walked", m' stâ tâ sintí pronounced  instead of  "I am feeling", m' labába pronounced  instead of  "I had washed".
The object form of the personal pronoun for the first person of the singular disappears but nasalizes the preceding vowel. Ex.: lebâ-m pronounced  instead of  "take me", metê-m pronounced  instead of  "put me", cudí-m pronounced  instead of  "answer me", compô-m pronounced  instead of  "fix me", bumbú-m pronounced  instead of  "put me on the back".

Brava
Brava Creole is spoken mainly on Brava Island. Speakers number 8,000. One of the least spoken being seventh place and one of the firsts to have written literature, in which Eugénio Tavares wrote some of his poems.

Besides the main characteristics of Sotavento Creoles, Brava Creole has the following:
 The progressive aspect of the present is formed by putting stâ before the verbs: stâ + V.
For example, coraçã , not coraçõ  "heart"; mã , not mõ  "hand"; razã , not razõ  "reason".

Fogo
Fogo Creole is spoken mainly in the Fogo of Cape Verde. It has around 50,000 speakers or nearly 5% of Cape Verdean Creole speakers including the diaspora's second language speakers. The rankings of this form of Cape Verdean Creole is fourth after Santo Antão and ahead of Sal.

Besides the main characteristics of Sotavento Creoles, Fogo has the following:
 The progressive aspect of the present is formed by putting stâ before the verbs: stâ + V.
Ex. coraçã  instead of coraçõ  "heart", mã  instead of mõ  "hand", razã  instead of razõ  "reason".
 The sound  switches to  when it is at the end of syllables. Ex. ártu  instead of áltu  "tall", curpâ  instead of culpâ  "to blame", burcã  instead of vulcõ  "volcano".
 The sound  disappears when it is at the end of words. Ex.: lugá  instead of lugár  "place", midjô  instead of midjôr  "better", mudjê  instead of mudjêr  "woman".
 The diphthongs (oral or nasal) are in general pronounced as vowels. Ex.: mã  instead of mãi  "mother", nã  instead of nãu  "no", pá  instead of pái  "father", rê  instead of rêi  "king", tchapê  instead of tchapêu  "hat".
 The pre-tonic sound  is velarized near labial or velar consonants. Ex.: badjâ "to dance" pronounced , cabêlu "hair" pronounced , catchô "dog" pronounced .

Maio
Maio Creole is spoken mainly on Maio Island. It numbers the entire island population which includes a small part which also speaks Portuguese.

It is one of the least spoken Cape Verdean Creole and is after Brava and ahead of Boa Vista.

Besides the main characteristics of Sotavento Creoles, Maio Creole has the following:
 The progressive aspect of the present is formed by putting stâ before the verbs: stâ + V.
 The unstressed final vowels  and  frequently disappear. Ex.: cumádr  instead of cumádri  "midwife", vilúd  instead of vilúdu  "velvet", bunít  instead of bunítu  "beautiful", cantád  instead of cantádu  "sung".
Ex. jantâ  instead of djantâ  "to dine", jôg  instead of djôgu  "game", but in words like djâ  "already", Djõ  "John" the sound  remains.

Santiago
Santiago Creole is spoken mainly on the Santiago Island of Cape Verde, including the capital of the country, Praia.

Besides the main characteristics of Sotavento Creoles, Santiago Creole has the following:
 The progressive aspect of the present is formed by putting sâ tâ before the verbs: sâ tâ + V.
 In the verbs, the stress goes back to the before the last syllable in the forms for the present. Ex.: cánta  instead of cantâ  "to sing", mêxe  or mêxi  instead of mexê  "to move", pârti  instead of partí  "to leave", cômpo  or cômpu  instead of compô  "to fix", búmbu  instead of bumbú  "to put on the back".
 Some speakers pronounce the voiced sibilants as voiceless. Ex. cássa  instead of cása  "house", ôxi  instead of ôji  "today".
Ex.: cáru  instead of cárru  "car", féru  instead of férru  "iron", curâl  instead of currál  "corral".
 The sound  is slightly aspirated .
 The nasal diphthongs are de-nasalized. Ex.: mâi  instead of mãi  "mother", nâu  instead of nãu  "no".
 The stressed sound  is pronounced  when it is before the sound  at the end of words. Ex.: curâl  instead of currál  "corral", mâl  instead of mál  "bad", Tarrafâl  instead of Tarrafál  "Tarrafal" (place name).

Barlavento
The Barlavento Creoles are spoken in the Barlavento Islands. Some characteristics:
The imperfective aspect of the past is formed joining the particle for the past ~va to the verbal actualizer tâ: táva + V.Note: In São Nicolau, along with táva + V also subsists the older form tá V+ba.
The personal pronoun for the second person of the plural is b'sôt.
The unstressed vowels  and  frequently disappear. Ex.: c'mádr  for cumádri  "midwife", v'lúd  for vilúdu  "velvet", c'dí  for cudí  "to answer", tch'gâ  for tchigâ  "to arrive".
Ex.: ólt  from áltu  "tall", cónd  from cándu  "when", macóc  from macácu  "monkey". Also with pronouns: b'tó-b  from botá-bu  "throw you".

Boa Vista
Boa Vista Creole is spoken mainly in the Boa Vista Island. Speakers number 5,000, and is the least spoken form of Creole in the language. Literature is rarely recorded but one of the speakers who was born on the island is Germano Almeida.

Besides the main characteristics of Barlavento Creoles, Boa Vista Creole has the following:
 The progressive aspect of the present is formed by putting tâ tâ before the verbs: tâ + tâ + V.
 In the verbs that end by ~a, that sound  is replaced by  when the verb is conjugated with the first person of the singular pronoun. Ex.: panhó-m  instead of panhâ-m  "to catch me", levó-m  instead of levâ-m  "to take me", coçó-m  instead of coçâ-m  "to scratch me".
 The stressed e is always open . Ex.: bucé  instead of bocê  "you (respectful form), drét  instead of drêt  "right", tchobé  instead of tchovê  "to rain". The stressed o is always open . Ex.: bó  instead of bô  "you", compó  instead of compô  "to fix", tórrt  instead of tôrt  "crooked".
 The sound  at the end of syllables is pronounced . Ex.: furrtâ  instead of furtâ  "to steal", m'djérr  instead of m'djêr  "woman", pórrt  instead of pôrt  "harbor".
Ex.: cárr  instead of cás  "which ones", érr  instead of ês  "they", quérr  instead of quês  "those".
Ex. jantâ  instead of djantâ  "to dine", jôg  instead of djôgu  "game", but in words like djâ  "already" and Djõ  "John", the sound  remains.

Sal
Sal Creole is spoken mainly in the island of Sal. Speakers number 15,000.

Besides the main characteristics of Barlavento Creoles, Sal Creole has the following:
 The progressive aspect of the present is formed by putting tâ tâ before the verbs: tâ + tâ + V.
 In the verbs that end by ~a, that sound  is represented by  when the verb is conjugated with the first person of the singular pronoun. Ex.: panhó-m  instead of panhâ-m  "to catch me", levó-m  instead of levâ-m  "to take me", coçó-m /koˈsɔm/ instead of coçâ-m  "to scratch me".
Ex. jantâ  instead of djantâ /dʒɐ̃ˈtɐ/ "to dine", jôg  instead of djôgu  "game", but in words like djâ  "already", Djõ  "John" the sound  remains.

Santo Antão
Santo Antão Creole is spoken mainly in the Santo Antão Island. It is ranked third of nine in the number of speakers and it is before Fogo and after the neighbouring São Vicente.

Besides the main characteristics of Barlavento Creoles, Santo Antão Creole has the following:
 The progressive aspect of the present is formed by putting tí tâ before the verbs: tí + tâ + V.
 The adverb of negation used with verbs, adverbs and adjectives is n. Ex.: Mí n' crê instead of M' câ crê "I don't want".
 The stressed final sound  is pronounced . Ex.: já  instead of djâ  "already", lá  instead of lâ  "there", and all the verbs that end by ~â, calcá  instead of calcâ  "to press", pintchá  instead of pintchâ  "to push", etc.
Ex.: ént's  instead of ánt's  "before", grénd  instead of gránd  "big", verdéd  instead of verdád  "truth". Also with pronouns: penhé-m  instead of panhá-m  "to catch me".
 Palatalization of the pre-tonic  sound (oral or nasal) to  when the stressed syllable possesses a palatal vowel. Ex.: essím  instead of assím  "like so", quebéça  instead of cabéça  "head". Velarization of the pre-tonic  sound (oral or nasal) to  when the stressed syllable possesses a velar vowel. Ex.: cotchôrr  instead of catchôrr  "dog", otúm  instead of atúm  "tuna".
 The diphthong  (oral or nasal) is pronounced . Ex.: pé  instead of pái  "father", mém  instead of mãi  "mother". The diphthong  (oral or nasal) is pronounced . Ex.: pó  instead of páu  "stick", nõ  instead of nãu  "no".
 The sound  (that originates from Portuguese , written "lh") is represented by the sound : bói  instead of bódj  "dance (noun)", ôi  instead of ôdj  "eye", spêi  instead of spêdj  "mirror". Between vowels that sound  disappears: vé'a  instead of bédja  "old (feminine)", o'á  instead of odjâ  "to see", pá'a  instead of pádja  "straw". When it is immediately after a consonant, it is represented by : m'liôr  instead of m'djôr  "better", c'liêr  instead of c'djêr  "spoon".
 The sound  disappears when it is between vowels. Ex.: go'áva  instead of goiába  "guava fruit", mê'a  instead of mêia  "sock", papá'a  instead of papáia  "papaw".
Ex. já  instead of djâ  "already", jantá  instead of djantâ  "to dine", Jõ  instead of Djõ  "John".
 Existence of a certain kind of vocabulary (also existing in São Vicente) that does not exist in the other islands. Ex.: dançá instead of badjâ "to dance", dzê instead of flâ "to say", falá instead of papiâ "to speak", guitá instead of djobê "to peek", ruf'ná instead of fuliâ "to throw", stód instead of stâ "to be", tchocá instead of furtâ "to steal", tchúc instead of pôrc "pig", etc.

São Nicolau
São Nicolau Creole is spoken mainly in the São Nicolau Island. There are 15,000 speakers, and is the fifth most spoken form of creole in the language. Literature is rarely recorded but the form of the Capeverdean Creole has been recorded in music.

Besides the main characteristics of Barlavento Creoles, São Nicolau Creole has the following:
 The progressive aspect of the present is formed by putting tâ tâ before the verbs: tâ + tâ + V.
 In the verbs that end by ~a, that sound  is represented by  when the verb is conjugated with the first person of the singular pronoun. Ex.: panhó-m  instead of panhâ-m  "to catch me", levó-m  instead of levâ-m  "to take me", coçó-m  instead of coçâ-m  "to scratch me".
Ex.: f'djêra  instead of f'guêra  "fig tree", patchê  instead of paquê  "because", Pr'djíça  instead of Pr'guiíça  "Preguiça" (place name), tchím  instead of quêm  "who".
Ex. jantâ  instead of djantâ  "to dine", jôg  instead of djôgu  "game", but in words like djâ  "already", Djõ  "John" the sound  remains.
Ex.: tabácu  instead of tabóc  "tobacco", frángu  instead of fróng  "chicken".

São Vicente
São Vicente Creole is spoken mainly in the São Vicente Island. It has about 80,000 to 100,000 speakers, primarily in the São Vicente island, but also in a large segment of the Cape Verdean diaspora population. It is the second most widely spoken Cape Verdean dialect. It has produced literature from many writers and musicians including Sergio Frusoni and many more.

Besides the main characteristics of Barlavento Creoles, São Vicente Creole has the following:
 The progressive aspect of the present is formed by putting tí tâ before the verbs: tí + tâ + V.
 The stressed final sound  is pronounced . Ex.: já  instead of djâ  "already", lá  instead of lâ  "there", and all the verbs that end by ~â, calcá  instead of calcâ  "to press", pintchá  instead of pintchâ  "to push", etc.
 The sound  (that originates from Portuguese , written "lh") is represented by the sound : bói  instead of bódj  "dance (noun)", ôi  instead of ôdj  "eye", spêi  instead of spêdj  "mirror". When it is after the sound , the sound  remains: fídj  "son", mídj  "corn". When it is immediately after a consonant, the sound  remains: m'djôr  "better", c'djêr  "spoon".
Ex. já  instead of djâ  "already", jantá  instead of djantâ  "to dine", Jõ  instead of Djõ  "John".
 Existence of a certain kind of vocabulary (also existing in Santo Antão) that does not exist in the other islands. Ex.: dançá instead of badjâ "to dance", dzê instead of flâ "to say", falá instead of papiâ "to speak", guitá instead of djobê "to peek", ruf'ná instead of fuliâ "to throw", stód instead of stâ "to be", tchocá instead of furtâ "to steal", tchúc instead of pôrc "pig", etc.

For more examples, see the Swadesh List of Cape Verdean Creole (in Portuguese).

 Cape Verdean Creole examples 

Example 1 (Santiago variant)

Excerpt of the lyrics of Dôci Guérra from Antero Simas. The full lyrics may be found (with a different orthography) in CABOINDEX » Blog Archive » Doce Guerra.

Example 2 (São Vicente variant)

Excerpt of the lyrics of Nôs Ráça from Manuel d' Novas. The full lyrics may be found (with a different orthography) in Cap-Vert :: Mindelo Infos :: Musique capverdienne: Nos raça Cabo Verde / Cape Verde.

Example 3

Free translation of the 1st article of the Universal Declaration of Human Rights.

See also
 Cesária Évora, a singer who sang in Cape Verdean Creole.
 Papiamento, a related language from the ABC islands in the Caribbean.

 References 

Bibliography
Linguistic books and texts

  (Coelho, F. Adolpho1880; capítulo 1: "Crioulo da Ilha de Santiago")
 O crioulo de Cabo Verde. Breves estudos sobre o crioulo das ilhas de Cabo Verde (Botelho da Costa, Joaquim Vieira & Custódio José Duarte1886)
 A Parábola do Filho Pródigo no crioulo de Santiago, do Fogo, da Brava, de Santo Antão, de S. Nicolau e da Boavista: O crioulo de Cabo Verde (Botelho da Costa, Joaquim Vieira & Custódio José Duarte1886)
 Dialectos crioulos-portugueses. Apontamentos para a gramática do crioulo que se fala na ilha de Santiago de Cabo Verde (Brito, A. de Paula1887)
 O dialecto crioulo de Cabo Verde (Silva, Baltasar Lopes da1957)
 Cabo Verde. Contribuição para o estudo do dialecto falado no seu arquipélago (Duarte, Dulce Almada1961)
 O dialecto crioulo – Léxico do dialecto crioulo do Arquipélago de Cabo Verde (Fernandes, Armando Napoleão Rodrigues1969)
 The Creole dialect of the island of Brava (Meintel, Deirdre1975) in Miscelânea luso-africana coord. Marius F. Valkhoff
 A linguistic approach to the Capeverdean language (Macedo, Donaldo Pereira1979)
 O crioulo de Cabo Verde – surto e expansão (Carreira, António1982)
 Left-dislocation and topicalization in Capeverdean creole (Braga, Maria Luiza: PhD Dissertation, University of Pennsylvania1982)
 Variation and change in the verbal system of Capeverdean crioulo (Silva, Izione Santos —1985)
 O crioulo da ilha de S. Nicolau de Cabo Verde (Cardoso, Eduardo Augusto1989)
 Kabuverdianu: Elementaria seiner TMA-Morphosyntax im lusokreolischen Vergleich (Thiele, Petra. Kabuverdianu1991)
 "O princípio da parcimónia em crioulo de Cabo Verde" (Pereira, Dulce1992: in Actas do II. Colóquio sobre Crioulos de base lexical portuguesa, pp. 141–151)
 O crioulo de Cabo Verde: Introdução à gramática (Veiga, Manuel1995)
 Dicionário Caboverdiano–Português, Variante de Santiago (Quint(-Abrial), Nicolas, Lisboa: Verbalis1998)
 Bilinguismo ou Diglossia (Duarte, Dulce Almada1998)
 Le créole du Cap-Vert. Etude grammaticale descriptive et contrastive (Veiga, Manuel2000)
 Le Cap-Verdien: Origines et devenir d'une langue métisse (Quint, Nicolas2000)
 Grammaire de la langue cap-verdienne: Étude descriptive et compréhensive du créole afro-portugais des Iles du Cap-Vert (Quint, Nicolas2000)
 Dictionnaire Cap-Verdien–français (Quint, Nicolas2000)
 Dicionário do Crioulo da Ilha de Santiago (Cabo Verde) com equivalentes de tradução em alemão e português (ed. por Jürgen Lang: Tübingen2002)
 Kurze Skizze der Grammatik des Kreols von Santiago (Kapverde) (Jürgen Lang – 2000 in: Neue Romania 23, 15–43)
 The syntax of Cape Verdean Creole. The Sotavento Varieties (Baptista, Marlyse2002)
 Dicionário Prático Português-Caboverdiano/Disionári Purtugés-Berdiánu Kiriolu di Santiagu Ku Splikasom di Uzu di Kada Palábra (M. Mendes, N. Quint, F. Ragageles, A. Semedo, Lisboa: Verbalis2002)
 O Cabo-verdiano em 45 Lições (Veiga,  Manuel2002)
 Parlons capverdien : Langue et culture (Nicolas Quint, Aires Semedo2003)
 Le créole capverdien de poche (Nicolas Quint, Aires Semedo, Chennevières-sur-Marne: Assimil2005)
 Crioulos de base portuguesa (Pereira, Dulce2006)
 Crioulo de Cabo VerdeSituação Linguística da Zona do Barlavento (Delgado, Carlos Alberto; Praia: IBNL2008)
 A Grammar of Santiago Creole (Cape Verde) = Gramática do Crioulo da Ilha de Santiago (Cabo Verde) (Jürgen Lang; Erlangen 2012 )
 A variação geográfica do crioulo caboverdiano (Jürgen Lang, Raimundo Tavares Lopes, Ana Karina Tavares Moreira, Maria do Céu dos Santos Baptista; Erlangen: FAU University Press, 2014 
 Les langues des autres dans la créolisation : théorie et exemplification par le créole d'empreinte wolof à l'île Santiago du Cap Vert (Jürgen Lang; Tübingen: Narr, 2009)

Literature

 Os Lusíadas (estâncias 8 e 9 do Canto V) Teixeira, A. da Costa1898
 Folk-Lore from the Cape Verde Islands (Parsons, Elsie Clews1923: Capeverdian Stories; book 1: English, book 2: Creole)
 Mornas – Cantigas Crioulas, Tavares, eugénio1932
 Renascença de uma civilização no Atlântico médio (Melo, Luís Romano de Madeira1967: Collection of poems and stories in Portuguese and in Creole)
 100 PoemasGritarei, Berrarei, Matarei, Não vou para pasárgada Martins, Ovídio, 1973Poems in Portuguese and in Creole
 Negrume/Lzimparin (Melo, Luís Romano de Madeira1973: Stories in Creole with Portuguese translation)
 "Textos crioulos cabo-verdianos"  (Frusoni, Sérgio1975) in Miscelânea luso-africana coord. Valkhoff, Marius F.
 Vangêle contód d'nôs móda (Frusoni, Sérgio : Fogo1979; Novo Testamento)
 A Poética de Sérgio Frusoni – uma leitura antropológica'' (Lima, Mesquitela; Lisboa1992)

External links 

Linguistic texts

 English - Cape Verdean online dictionary
 Criol language
 History of Cape Verdean Creole
 Creole grammars and dictionaries from Cape Verde
 A Perspective on Capeverdean Crioulo by Robert French
 Santiago Creole
 Literaturas Africanas (African literatures in the Portuguese language and Portuguese creoles, pdf: in Portuguese)
 Student Survey 2000 about teaching Crioulo in the high school.
 Language Policy in Cape Verde: A Proposal for the Affirmation of Kriolu, by Manuel Veiga.
 Initiation au Créole Capverdien
 English-Cape Verdean Dictionary of the Peace Corps
 Asosiason Kabuverdianu pa Traduson di Bíblia
Afabétu Kabuverdianu, (Cape Verdean Alphabet, see last picture link in top frame)
Kartidjas Kabuverdianu – (four literacy primers pdf, see fifth picture link in top frame)

Literature
 "Morna aguada" by Eugénio Tavares (Creole of Brava)
 Extracts from "Os Lusíadas" in the creole of Santo Antão
 Poetry of Sérgio Frusoni, in Creole of São Vicente
 Adriano Gominho (Creole of São Nicolau)
 Santo Antão
 Poetry in Creole
 Asosiason Kabuverdianu pa Traduson di Bíblia  Books: Stória di Natal (the Christmas Story), Lúkas, Notísia Sabi di Jizus (Luke, The Good News of Jesus), Bíblia na prugrésu di traduson pa lingua Kabuverdianu (The Bible in progress of translation into the Kabuverdianu Language, Luke 2nd ed. and Acts 1st ed. – see third picture link in top frame), Comics: Stória di Bon Samaritanu (The Story of the Good Samaritan), Stória di Fidju ki Perde (The Story of the Prodigal Son), Stória di Zakeu, Xéfi di Kobradoris di Inpostu, (The Story of Zacchaeus, chief tax collector – see links in left frame), Film: Filmi: Vida di Jizus (The Jesus Film – see fourth picture link in top frame) Best viewed with Internet Explorer.

 
Languages of Cape Verde
Portuguese-based pidgins and creoles